The Peace Park is a small public park located across from Christchurch Cathedral on the corner of Nicholas Street and Christchurch Place in the Liberties area of Dublin city centre. Designed in the late 1980s as a sunken garden, with an aim towards reducing the traffic noise from the busy junction at which it exists, the park was dedicated to Ireland's desire for peace in 1988 during the Troubles. In 2009/2010 it was decided to close the park indefinitely due to loitering and antisocial behaviour and for nearly 10 years it remained shut.

History
The park is situated on the site of Dublin's old Tholsel, an important building which combined the function of civic hall, guildhall, court and gaol from the time of the Norman invasion of Ireland until it was demolished around 1809. Activities carried on at the Tholsel included that of a merchants' exchange, and sittings of the City Recorder's Court where punishments for crimes less serious than murder were meted out. These punishments included being whipped while being dragged behind a horse and cart from Skinner's Row (modern day Christchurch Place) to College Green some distance away. Alternatively, convicted people were flayed and/or pilloried at the front of the building. These punishments had ceased by the late 1700s. Part of the remains of the church of St. Nicholas Within stand to the south-west of the park.

Prior to redevelopment in 2019, the park's main features included a bronze 'Tree of Life' statue, a fountain, and quotes from Irish poets W. B. Yeats and Patrick Kavanagh engraved on surfaces. The 'Tree of Life' cast bronzes were originally placed in the garden for the Dublin Millennium celebrations which were celebrated in the city in 1988 (other commemorative ventures that year included the installation of the Molly Malone statue on Grafton Street). In front of the park stands "Millennium Child", a sculpture of three bronze statues of children playing created by John Behan which was unveiled by President of Ireland Mary McAleese in November 2000 to celebrate "the Children of the New Millennium".

Refurbishment
As part of Dublin City Council's 'Liberties Greening Strategy', the park was identified for refurbishment in the 2010s. In July 2018, Dermot Foley Landscape Architects were commissioned by Dublin City Council to revive the existing park and reinvent it as a memorial. The park had been closed for many years prior to the restoration and elements of a previous design were damaged. The Flanders Fields memorial was installed as well as herbaceous ground cover planting and a canopy layer of viburnum farreri and prunus × yedoensis. After being closed to the public for nearly a decade, due to anti-social behaviour such as public drinking and drug use, the Peace Park re-opened on 26 June 2019 after the refurbishment project and Flanders Fields memorial had been completed. The newly designed garden had also been raised with a ramped access so that it be fully accessible. Dublin City Council said that the aim of the memorial was "to bring people together in reflection about war and peace, about sacrifice and suffering, about tolerance and hope, about forgiveness and reconciliation".

Flanders Fields memorial
On 30 April 2019, a memorial to all those from the island of Ireland who died in Flanders Fields during World War I was unveiled in the park. A ceremony took place to mark the occasion which was jointly organised by Dublin City Council and the government of Flanders, Belgium. Soil from Flanders was integrated with Irish soil from all four provinces and placed within a circle of sandblasted Leinster granite reflecting the circular design in the roof of the Menin Gate war memorial in Ypres, Belgium. The memorial was covered with a grass sward and engraved with poetry from Irish war poet Francis Ledwidge. Around the memorial, benches of Belgian blue stone were engraved with the crests of Leinster, Munster, Ulster and Connacht.

Controversies
At the January 2018 meeting of Dublin City Council's commemorations subcommittee, where the members were briefed on the proposal to incorporate Irish soil into the Flanders Fields memorial at the Peace Park, four members of the committee opposed the Flanders Memorial. It had been argued previously by councillors, including the former Lord Mayor Mícheál Mac Donncha, and the then current Lord Mayor Nial Ring, that it would be inappropriate to have a war memorial in a 'peace' garden or park. In a February 2018 meeting, the alternative option of placing it instead in the War Memorial Gardens, Islandbridge was explored but ultimately rejected.

The choosing of 1988 as the year in which to celebrate the millennium of the founding of Dublin city was also not without its own controversy.

References

Parks in Dublin (city)